"My Father and My Mother" is the fourth television play episode of the first season of the American television series CBS Playhouse. The episode starred Gene Hackman as a New York editor struggling as a husband and parent who looks back and learns of the difficulties his own parents faced in life.

The episode was broadcast in February 1968, and received an Emmy award nomination for the score, written by Bernard Green.

References

External links 
 

1968 American television episodes
1968 plays
CBS Playhouse episodes